Sumalia is a genus of butterflies found in Southeast Asia ranging from the Indian Himalayan Region to the Sunda Islands.

Species
Sumalia agneya (Doherty, 1891)
Sumalia chilo (Grose-Smith, 1897)
Sumalia daraxa (Doubleday, [1848])
Sumalia zulema (Doubleday, [1848])

References

External links
Images representing Sumalia at EOL
Images representing Sumalia  at Bold

Limenitidinae
Nymphalidae genera
Taxa named by Frederic Moore